Tom Hatton (born 12 November 1986 in Birmingham, England) is an Australian motorcycle racer. He has appeared in the 125cc World Championship as a wild card rider.

Career statistics

Grand Prix motorcycle racing

By season

Races by year
(key)

References

External links
 Profile on MotoGP.com

1986 births
Living people
Australian motorcycle racers
125cc World Championship riders